Jonathan Herbert Samuel, 5th Viscount Samuel (born 17 December 1965) is the current Viscount Samuel. He is the son of Dan Samuel, 4th Viscount Samuel.

References

1965 births
British Jews
Jonathan
5
Living people